Christopher Kelham is a British film actor and producer best known for his lead role as Dale in the 2010 film The Cost of Love.

Filmography
2001: Representative Radio as Ben
2004: Fakers as Tim
2005: What's Your Name 41? as Carlos Santini
2009: Trial & Retribution as a reporter (in 1 episode - "Siren Part1 " -- TV series) 
2011: The Cost of Love as Dale
2011: Hustle as hotel manager (in 1 episode "Old Sparks Come New"—TV series)

References

External links

British male film actors
British male television actors
Year of birth missing (living people)
Living people